Magni Fannberg Magnússon (born 12 August 1979) is an Icelandic football coach. He is currently the Development manager of AIK.

Early life
Magni grew up in Súðavík and Ísafjörður in the Westfjords region of Iceland.

Coaching career
In 2006, Magni was hired as an assistant coach to Sigurður Jónsson at Grindavík. With two games left of the season, he took over as manager along with Milan Stefán Jankovic aftur Sigurður left the team. He resigned from the team in October 2006, after the chairman of Ungmennafélag Grindavíkur ripped into Magni, Sigurður and Jankovic in a scathing article posted on the team's official website.

In October 2007, he was hired as the manager of Fjarðarbyggð. He resigned from his post in end of July the same year with the team in 8th place.

From 2009 to 2016, Magni coached at IF Brommapojkarna, including as the manager of the men's team from 2014 to 2015.

He served as the development manager of SK Brann from 2016 to 2019. In March 2019, he was hired as the development manager of AIK.
The same year, he served as a scout with the Icelandic men's national team.

References

External links
 

1979 births
Living people
Magni Fannberg Magnusson
Magni Fannberg Magnusson
Magni Fannberg Magnusson
Association footballers not categorized by position
Association football players not categorized by nationality